Elizabeth Manning may refer to:

 Elizabeth Adelaide Manning (1828–1905), British writer and editor
 Dame Elizabeth Leah Manning (1886–1977), British politician
 Elizabeth Manning (1747-1805), the subject of the legal case White v Driver